Bullied (also known as Unstable) is an American 2005 found footage crime horror thriller film written and directed by Anthony Spadaccini. The film stars Spadaccini, Bobby Hamilton, James Schaeffer, Steve Brown, Wayland Harris, Chris Erickson, Eric Simpson, and Amy Kies. The film tells the story of an aspiring filmmaker named Anthony on a camping trip when his gay friend, Bobby, is found dead and is thought to have been killed by his homophobic friend, Jim.

Plot 
Anthony is an aspiring filmmaker who's short film wins at a film festival and he wins a scholarship to a film school of his choice. His friend, Jim, proposes a camping trip over the weekend to celebrate. Anthony invites his friends Wade, Chris, Amy, Eric, and Bobby, a gay teenage boy. Jim, who is homophobic, is angered due to Bobby being invited and antagonizes him throughout the weekend such as calling him homophobic slurs, refusing to let him make a s'more, and disallowing him from eating or coming near him, much to the distress of Bobby and everyone else. One night, angered and frustrated by each other, Bobby and Jim both take a walk in the forest on separate paths. Jim comes back later on but Bobby does not. Concerned, the group looks for him and discover his bloodied corpse on a rock. Immediately, Wade accuses Jim of the death of Bobby, due to Jim homophobically antagonizing Bobby throughout the weekend. Jim, however, denies having a part in the death of Bobby. Frustrated, Jim takes another walk through the forest. Anthony and Wade begin to accuse each other of being responsible for Bobby's death when Jim returns with a gun and commits suicide by shooting himself in the head. The police arrive the next morning.

Cast 

 Anthony Spadaccini as Anthony
 Bobby Hamilton as Bobby
 James Schaeffer as Jim
 Steve Brown as Steve 
 Wayland Harris as Wade
 Chris Erickson as Chris  
 Eric Simpson as Eric 
 Amy Kies as Amy

References 

2005 crime thriller films
2005 crime drama films
2005 horror films
Films about anti-LGBT sentiment
Gay-related films
Homophobia in fiction
Films set in forests
Films about camping
Found footage films
Films about bullying
Films about teenagers
2000s mystery thriller films
2000s mystery horror films
2000s mystery drama films
LGBT-related horror thriller films
LGBT-related horror drama films
American black-and-white films
Films about child death
Films about friendship
Films about suicide
2000s LGBT-related films